Eric Engler (born 21 September 1991) is a German professional racing cyclist. He rode at the 2015 UCI Track Cycling World Championships.

References

External links
 

1991 births
Living people
German male cyclists
Sportspeople from Cottbus
Cyclists from Brandenburg